Treasure Box (1996) is a horror novel by American writer Orson Scott Card. It takes place in modern-day America.

Plot introduction
The plot details a middle-aged man, Quentin Fears (pronounced "fierce"), who marries a woman who turns out to be from a strange family. The story unfolds as Quentin tries to stop a witch in the family from unleashing a great evil upon the world.

Influences
As with many of Card's other literature, a Christian/Mormon influence is present in this book.

Reception
Publishers Weekly complimented the plot and characters. Kirkus Reviews also cited strong characterization, but said the plot was neither realistic nor surprising.

See also
List of works by Orson Scott Card
Orson Scott Card

References

External links
 About the novel Treasure Box from Card's website

1996 American novels
1996 fantasy novels
Novels by Orson Scott Card
1990s horror novels
HarperCollins books